Colus kujianus is a species of sea snail, a marine gastropod mollusk in the family Colidae, the true whelks and the like.

Distribution
This marine species occurs off of eastern Honshu, Japan, at depths of about 170 meters.

References

 Hasegawa K. (2009) Upper bathyal gastropods of the Pacific coast of northern Honshu, Japan, chiefly collected by R/V Wakataka-maru. In: T. Fujita (ed.), Deep-sea fauna and pollutants off Pacific coast of northern Japan. National Museum of Nature and Science Monographs 39: 225-383.
 Okutani T. (2017). Family Buccinidae. Pp. 917-939, in: T. Okutani (ed.), Marine Mollusks in Japan, ed. 2. 2 vols. Tokai University Press. 1375 pp

External links
 Tiba R. (1973). Descriptions of Two New Species of the Genus Colus (Buccinidae). Venus (Japanese Journal of Malacology). 32(3): 65-69

Buccinidae
Gastropods described in 1973